Isabella Star LaBlanc (born 1997) is an American actress and writer.

Personal life 
LaBlanc is a member of the Sisseton Wahpeton Dakota tribal nation. She was born in Saint Paul, Minnesota and attended St. Paul Academy. LaBlanc is married. When traveling for work, she brings cotton fabric with her to use in a traditional tobacco tying practice.

Career 
Her first acting role was at the SteppingStone Theatre at eight years old, and she subsequently performed in a number of plays and stage acts in Minnesota, such as in The Wolves at the Jungle Theater as a teenager. In 2019, she drew attention for her performance as Tiger Lily in the play Peter Pan and Wendy at the Shakespeare Theatre Company in Washington, DC. She has also written a number of short performance works and a script ("Writing A War Novel").

In 2021, LaBlanc received a Princess Grace Award, nominated by the McCarter Theatre. The same year, her work as an audiobook narrator for the young adult novel Firekeeper's Daughter was praised by Booklist, which called it a "sensitive reading." On film, LaBlanc has appeared in Long Slow Exhale and a prequel to Pet Sematary. In 2022, LaBlanc was cast in the fourth season of True Detective on HBO in a lead role.

References

External links 
 

1997 births
Living people
American stage actresses
American television actresses
Actresses from Saint Paul, Minnesota
Native American actresses
Sisseton Wahpeton Oyate people